Levente Szijarto (born June 15, 1982) is a Romanian professional basketball player for Steaua București of the Romanian League.

References

1982 births
Living people
CSU Asesoft Ploiești players
Point guards
Sportspeople from Oradea
Romanian men's basketball players
Shooting guards